Dynoides brevispina is a species of isopod in the family Sphaeromatidae.

References

brevispina